The Embassy of the Denmark in Ottawa is Denmark's embassy in Canada. It is located at suite 450, 47 Clarence Street in Ottawa, the Canadian capital. Hanne Fugl Eskjær serves as Ambassador (as of 2019).

Denmark operates secondary Canadian consulate offices in Calgary, Edmonton, Halifax, Iqaluit, Montreal, Regina, Saint John, St. John's, Toronto, Vancouver and Winnipeg.

External links
Embassy of Denmark in Canada
 , Department of Foreign Affairs and International Trade (Canada), July 2007

Denmark
Ottawa
Canada–Denmark relations